Catharina Elisabeth Wassink (1891-1983) was a Dutch artist.

Biography 
Catharina (Teau) Wassink was born on 2 March 1891 in Amsterdam as daughter of general practitioner Dr. Louis N.S. Wassink and Nelly E. Coomans de Ruiter. She attended the Instituut Piersma. Her teachers included Agnieta Gijswijt, Wilhelmina Cornelia Kerlen, Hendrik Maarten Krabbé, and Johan Piersma. Her work was included in the 1939 exhibition and sale Onze Kunst van Heden (Our Art of Today) at the Rijksmuseum in Amsterdam.  She was a member of
Arti et Amicitiae.

Wassink died on 15 September 1983 in Amstelveen.

References

1891 births
1983 deaths
Artists from Amsterdam
20th-century Dutch women artists